Pectinariidae, or the trumpet worms or ice cream cone worms, are a family of marine polychaete worms that build tubes using grains of sand roughly resembling ice cream cones or trumpets. The earliest pectinariid fossils are known from the Cretaceous.

Ecology
Pectinariids are sessile burrowing tube dwellers, which can be found in fine-grained sediment. They position the wider end of their tube downwards, and use their stout golden setae for digging while they use tentacles for sorting the particles which they ingest. Half of the particles which the worm digs through are excreted as pseudofaeces.

Genera
The systematics of the pectinariids have been the subject of some debate. Previously, only two genera have been recognized, but three subgenera have been elevated to full genera by some scholars.
 Amphictene Savigny, 1818 - sometimes included as subgenera in Pectinaria
 Cistenides Malmgren, 1866 - sometimes included as subgenera in Pectinaria
 Lagis Malmgren, 1866 - sometimes included as subgenera in Pectinaria
 Pectinaria Savigny, 1818
 Petta Malmgren, 1866

References

External links
 
 
 
 from A Guide to Singapore Polychaetes
 Pectinaria at MBL Marine Organisms Database
 Family Pectinariidae
 The Polychaeta Terebellida homepage: Pectinariidae 

Terebellida
Taxa named by Jean Louis Armand de Quatrefages de Bréau
Annelid families